Bank Handlowy w Warszawie (BHW) or Citi Handlowy is a Polish bank based in Warsaw, established in 1870. It is one of the oldest banks in Poland and Europe. It is the 10th largest bank in Poland in terms of assets, and 18th in terms of number of outlets.

It is currently operating under the brand name Citi (formerly Citibank) and is owned by Citigroup. Its current headquarters is in the Jabłonowski Palace.

History

It was founded in 1870 by a group of bourgeoisie financiers, landowners and intelligentsia. The initiator was the financier Leopold Stanisław Kronenberg (1812-1878). The first president of the bank was Jozef Zamoyski.

By 1872, the bank had branches and offices in St Petersburg, Moscow, Berlin, Gdańsk (Commerzbank in Warschau), Szczecin and Łódź, and representative offices in Włocławek, Płock, Grójec, Guzów, Lublin and Rawa Mazowiecka. In subsequent years, it opened branches in other cities, including Sosnowiec (1895), Częstochowa (1897) and Kalisz (1898). In the early years of the twentieth century the bank was the largest private bank in Polish lands and one of the few leading financial services to trade with Russia and Western Europe. During this period, the bank's turnover fluctuated at the level of 2 billion rubles, which was greater than the sum of the then budget of the Russian Empire.

The bank made a significant contribution to the construction of the railway network and major industrial plants in the Polish Kingdom. In the 1920s and 1930s the bank represented the Polish government's assets in numerous international companies, notably the Danzig Shipyard. The bank did not stop its activities during the two world wars, it only limited activity. During World War II, the bank's branches in the areas annexed by Germany were liquidated, while those in the General Government operated under the strict control of the occupation authorities.

Reactivated in 1945, the bank was a private industrial and commercial company and cooperative. As one of the three banks which escaped formal nationalization after the war, it was subjected to controls of a government commissioner and the state took a significant amount of shares. During the People's Republic of Poland it was one of two banks (along with Pekao SA), operating as a joint stock company.

After 1945, the bank was the main Polish foreign correspondent bank, and in 1964 it received the official monopoly on Polish foreign trade transactions. This resulted as a consequence of the construction of the then-largest Polish financial institutional network of correspondent banks, opening a branch in London, foreign representative offices in New York City, Moscow, Belgrade, Rome and Berlin, and affiliation in Vienna, Luxembourg and Frankfurt. After 1989, the bank lost a privileged position in foreign trade and began to transform gradually into a commercial bank, opening a number of branches around the country.

During the political transformation, the bank (especially a bank branch in Luxembourg) had played a significant role in the scandal of the Foreign Debt Service Fund (Fundusz Obsługi Zadłużenia Zagranicznego - FOZZ) Zbigniew Masłowski, the Director of the Commercial Bank in Luxembourg in the years 1985 - 1990, tried to oppose this practice. A large number of foreign exchange operations conducted by FOZZ were only through the bank. An inspection of the bank by the Supreme Audit Office (Poland), led by Inspector Halina Ładomirska in 1991-1992 revealed numerous irregularities. The report shows that during the period of foreign exchange market control, they were operated to the detriment of the Polish economy with estimated losses during these two years of 5-10 billion dollars, .

In 1997, the bank was privatized.

The current bank

In 2001 Bank Handlowy merged with Citibank (Poland) SA. Currently, the largest shareholder is Citibank, NA (since 14 August 2007, they have 75% of the shares and 75% of votes at the AGM).

Since June 1997, Bank Handlowy has been listed on the Warsaw Stock Exchange, and is listed on the WIG20 index.

List of directors

 1870-1871 – Józef Zamoyski
 1872-1878 – Leopold Stanisław Kronenberg
 1878-1880 – Juliusz Wertheim
 1881-1887 – Stanisław Leopold Kronenberg
 1888-1926 – Leopold Julian Kronenberg
 1927-1931 – Stanisław Sebastian Lubomirski
 1932-1939 – August Zaleski
 1939-1944 – Józef Żychliński
 1945-1946 – Stanisław Wachowiak
 1947-1948 – Jerzy Jurkiewicz
 1949-1951 – Zygmunt Karpiński
 1951-1956 – Jakub Prawin
 1956-1966 – Michał Rola-Żymierski
 1967-1968 – Stanisław Majewski
 1968-1973 – Henryk Kisiel
 1974-1977 – Witold Bień
 1978-1980 – Marian Krzak
 1981-1986 – Witold Bień
 1986-1988 – Andrzej Dorosz
 1989-1990 – Janusz Sawicki
 1991-1996 – Andrzej Olechowski
 1996-1998 – Grzegorz Wójtowicz
 1998-2000 – Andrzej Olechowski
 2000-2012 – Stanisław Sołtysiński
 2012-2021 – Andrzej Olechowski

References

Literature

 Zbigniew Landau, Jerzy Tomaszewski: Bank Handlowy w Warszawie S.A. Zarys dziejów 1870–1995, MUZA S.A. Warszawa 1995 (in Polish)

External links
Citi Handlowy homepage

Citigroup
Banks of Poland
Banks established in 1870
1870 in Poland
Companies based in Warsaw
Companies listed on the Warsaw Stock Exchange
Companies set up in the Second Republic of Poland